Mahimaganj is a union parishad under Gobindaganj Upazila, Gaibandha District, Rangpur Division, Bangladesh. There is a sugar mill named Rangpur Sugar Mills Limited. There is a railway station. There are many primary schools, high schools, madrashas and colleges in Mahimaganj. Mahimaganj Alia Kamil Madrasha is one of the largest madrasha institution in North Bengal which is situated in Mahimaganj.

Geography
The Bangali River is the union's approximate eastern boundary (across which lies Saghata Upazila).

Demographics
According to the 2011 Bangladesh census, Mahimaganj Union had 9,252 households and a population of 36,791. The literacy rate (age 7 and over) was 44.4%, compared to the national average of 51.8%.

Organization 

Sugar mills
 Rangpur Sugar Mills Limited has a daily capacity of 1,500 metric tons.

Prodhan Group

Rice mills
 M/s. Prodhan Traders (Exporter & Importer). {Est.-1988}
 M/s. Nehan Traders (Exporter & Importer). {Est.-2006}
 M/s. Prodhan Agro Food Industries has a daily capacity of 100 metric tons. {Est.-2010}
 M/s. Tania Agro Food Industries has a daily capacity of 100 metric tons. {Est.-2011}
 Prodhan Food Agro Industries Limited has a daily capacity of 350 metric tons. {Est.-2013}
 Nehan Agro Industries has a daily capacity of 150 metric tons. {Est.-2014}

Oil mills
 Prodhan Oil Mill's Limited has a daily capacity of 350 metric tons. (Rice Bran Oil). {Est.-2015}

Nehan Group
 M/s. Nehan Traders (Exporter & Importer) {Est.-2014}
 M/s. Nehan Agro Industries. {Est.-2015}

Sports organizations
 Mahimaganj Town Club XI
 Mahimaganj Kheloar Kallyan Club

Cultural Organizations:
 Mahimaganj Shilpakala Academy

Administration
Mahimaganj Union is divided into 11 mauzas: Balua, Baman Hazra, Bochadaha, Jagadishpur, Jibanpur, Jirai, Khurda Gopalpur, Kumiradanga, Pantair, Panthamari, and Sreepatipur.

Transport
The Mahimaganj Railway Station is the main railway station providing trains on national routes operated by the state-run Bangladesh Railway.

Education
M A Motalib technical & BM College, Mahimaganj Degree College, founded in 1972 and Mahimaganj Women's College, founded in 1999 are the major college in the union.

According to Banglapedia, Rangpur Sugar Mills KG High School, founded in 1962, is a notable secondary school.

The madrasa education system includes one kamil madrasa, Mahimaganj Alia Kamil Madrasa, founded in 1937.

Notable residents
 Ahmed Hossain (Chairman Rangpur District Board, Minister for Agriculture, Forest & Fisheries)

References

Populated places in Rangpur Division
Unions of Gobindaganj Upazila